José Antonio Attolini Lack (24 April 1931 – 28 February 2012) was a Mexican architect.

Biography 
Attolini graduated at the Faculty of Architecture of the Universidad Nacional Autónoma de México (UNAM) in Mexico City in December 1955. He has designed several recognized commercial and religious buildings, as well as accommodation buildings. The first buildings he realized predominantly in Mexico City, in León and in Cuernavaca. Since 1955 he has been professor of architecture at the Faculty of Architecture of the UNAM. After 1970 he also lectured at the Universidad La Salle and later also at the Universidad Anáhuac del Sur. He is emeritus member of the Academia Mexicana de Arquitectura.
In 1992 he was awarded the gold medal in the II Biennale of Architecture and in 2002 he was honored with the National Prize of Architecture in Mexico.

Awards 
 1961: Premio Casa-habitación
 1992: Gold medal, II biennale of architecture
 2002, 2008: National prize of architecture (awarded twice)

See also 
 Mexican people of Italian descent

References

External links 
 

1931 births
2012 deaths
Mexican architects
Academic staff of the National Autonomous University of Mexico
People from Ciudad Juárez
Mexican people of Italian descent